Saint Edeyrn ( century) was a pre-congregational saint of Wales, related to Vortigern and the royal house of Powys and the brother of Saint Aerdeyrn and Elldeyrn. Edeyrn is the patron saint of Lannédern in France and Llanedeyrn in Wales, where he founded a monastery of over 300 people.

Legend
Legend holds he was a companion of King Arthur, before moving to France where he became a Hermit. Being from the family of Vortigen, however, would make a relationship with King Arthur unlikely.

Legacy
He is remembered in churches across Wales and Brittany including Monmouth and Llanedeyrn near Cardiff in Wales and Lannédern in Brittany France.  He is often depicted riding a deer and his feast day is 6 January.

Gallery

References

6th-century births
Year of birth unknown
Year of death unknown